Pinkin de Corozal is the professional female volleyball team of Corozal, Puerto Rico.

Squads

Previous

Current
Coach names current as of August 2022
 Head Coach:  Angel Perez
 Assistant Coach: 
 Assistant Coach: 
 Physical Trainer :  Gabriel Gordillo

Palmares

League Championship
A total of 18 championships, the most in LVSF history. These are:
1968, 1969, 1970, 1971, 1972, 1973, 1974, 1975, 1977, 1979, 1980, 1981, 1982, 1983, 1984, 2008, 2010,2022

References

Puerto Rican volleyball clubs
Volleyball clubs established in 1968